The 1979 U.S. Pro Indoor was a men's tennis tournament played on indoor carpet courts that was part of the 1979 Colgate-Palmolive Grand Prix. It was played at the Spectrum in Philadelphia, Pennsylvania in the United States and was held from January 22 through January 28, 1979. First-seeded Jimmy Connors won his second consecutive title at the event.

Finals

Singles

 Jimmy Connors defeated  Arthur Ashe 6–3, 6–4, 6–1
 It was Connors' 2nd singles title of the year and the 73rd of his career.

Doubles

 Wojciech Fibak /  Tom Okker defeated  Peter Fleming /  John McEnroe 5–7, 6–1, 6–3
 It was Fibak's 1st title of the year and the 39th of his career. It was Okker's 1st title of the year and the 72nd of his career.

References

External links
 ITF tournament edition details

U.S. Pro Indoor
U.S. Pro Indoor
U.S. Professional Indoor
U.S. Professional Indoor
U.S. Professional Indoor
Tennis in Pennsylvania